Bileh Daraq may refer to:
 Bileh Daraq, Ardabil
 Bileh Daraq, Sareyn, Ardabil Province